Overgate or The Overgate may refer to:

 Overgate Centre, a shopping centre in Dundee, Scotland
 Overgate (former Dundee street), former street in Dundee, replaced by the Overgate Centre during the 1960s
 V9 Overgate, part of the Milton Keynes grid road system
 Overgate Hospice Choir, a choir based in Halifax, West Yorkshire which raises money for the Overgate Hospice
 The Overgate (folk song), a folk song with Roud number 866